NGC 1294 is a lenticular galaxy located about 285 million light-years away in the constellation Perseus. The galaxy was discovered by astronomer William Herschel on October 17, 1786 and is a member of the Perseus Cluster.

See also
 List of NGC objects (1001–2000)
 NGC 1250

References

External links

Perseus Cluster
Perseus (constellation)
Lenticular galaxies
1294
012600 
Astronomical objects discovered in 1786
02694
+07-07-076